Sardaarji is a 2015 Indian Punjabi fantasy comedy film directed by Rohit Jugraj, and starring Diljit Dosanjh, Mandy Takhar and Neeru Bajwa in lead roles. The trailer of the film was released on 18 May 2015. Sardaar Ji is one of the first fantasy films to be made in Punjabi cinema. It released on 26 June 2015, and had the biggest opening ever for a Punjabi film in Punjab.

Plot
Jaggi (Diljit Dosanjh) is tasked with driving away a ghost (Neeru Bajwa) who haunts a mansion in London. However hilarious situations ensue when he falls in love with ghost.

Cast
 Diljit Dosanjh as Jaggi, the ghost hunter from Samrala
 Neeru Bajwa as Pinky, the spirit 
 Mandy Takhar as Jasmine Kaur
 Jaswinder Bhalla as Armeek Singh Master
 Amritpal Chotu as Joondi, Jaggi's friend
 Ali Kazmi as Bilal Choudary
 Anita Kailey as Ruksana Bibi, Bilal's fiancée
 Damanpreet Singh as young Jaggi
 Avy Randhawa as Jaggi's Guide Angel
 Sunita Dhir as Pinky's Mother
 Jas Heer as Jasmine's Mother
 Bhavkhandan Singh Rakhra as Jasmine's father
 Darren Andrichuk as ghost Hunter from Discovery Channel
 Jessica Singh as Ghost
 Punam Randhawa as Mrs. Sharma
 Natasha Sharma as News Reporter
 Baljinder Darapuri as villager
 Sonam Bajwa Special Appearance in Veervaar song

Soundtrack

Track listing

Reception

Box office

The movie had a record opening in the history of Punjabi Cinema, it opened to 100% occupancies and shattered previous openings record of Jatt & Juliet 2. It collected  on its first day in Punjab while Jatt & Juliet 2 earned  on its opening day. Sardaar Ji beat Bollywood film ABCD 2 at overseas box office and topped the international collection chart.

Critical response
CNN-IBN, Hindustan Times & The Tribune gave positive reviews to the movie. Film was also reviewed by British media like The Guardian.

Sequel

A Sequel, entitled Sardaar Ji 2, directed by Rohit Jugaraj, written by Dheeraj Rattan and produced by White Hill Production, was released on 24 June 2016. Diljit Dosanjh, Monica Gill and Sonam Bajwa starring as main leads.

Telugu remake
Telugu Filmmaker Vasu Manthena acquired the rights of Sardaar Ji, to produce it in Telugu cinema.

Television viewership record
In December 2015, Sardaar Ji broke UK TV ratings records by delivering the biggest ever audience for a channel as it registered a huge 54,900 viewers, peaking at 90,000 viewers.

Accolades

References

External links
 
Sardaar Ji Facebook

Films directed by Rohit Jugraj Chauhan
2015 films
Indian fantasy comedy films
2010s fantasy comedy films
Films scored by Jatinder Shah
Films scored by Nick Dhammu
Punjabi-language Indian films
2010s Punjabi-language films
2010s ghost films
Indian ghost films
Indian haunted house films
Films set in country houses
Films set in London
Films shot in England
2015 comedy films